Emmalyn Estrada (born April 5, 1992), known professionally as Emmalyn, is a Canadian singer. Her first single, 'Get Down', entered Billboards Canadian Hot 100 chart for the week of August 29, 2009, at number 88 and peaked at number 59 for the week of October 31, 2009. She is best known as a member of the girl group G.R.L. formed by Robin Antin.

Personal life 
Emmalyn is the youngest in her family and attended Holy Cross Regional High School in Surrey, British Columbia. She is of Filipino descent. In October 2009, Emmalyn decided to move to Los Angeles, California. In June 2011, Emmalyn moved back to her hometown of Surrey, British Columbia. She is the younger sister of Elise Estrada. She recently gave birth to a baby girl in May 2022.

Career

2009–2010: Career beginnings 

In May 2009, Estrada competed in the 2009 Beat Music Awards hosted by Vancouver's The Beat 94.5. Estrada won the competition Her single, "Get Down" debuted on July 2, 2009, on the Kid Carson Show, again on The Beat 94.5.  The single was nominated in the Dance/Urban/Rhythmic category of the 13th annual Canadian Radio Music Awards, which recognizes new songs that secured the most airplay on Canadian radio stations as recorded by Nielsen Broadcast Data Systems.

In May 2009, Emmalyn released her first single "Get Down" with RockSTAR Music Corp after winning The 2009 Beat Music Awards. Emmalyn is not signed to RockSTAR Music Corp after winning The 2009 Beat Music Awards.

On November 29, 2010, Emmalyn's first music video for her first single "Don't Make Me Let You Go" premiered on her YouTube account. This is her first music video with her new record label TUG (The Ultimate Group) Music Entertainment.

2013–2015: Rise to fame and G.R.L. 
In March 2013, Estrada had a recurring role in the popular A&E television series Bates Motel.

She was a member of the girl group G.R.L. alongside Lauren Bennett, Natasha Slayton, Paula van Oppen and Simone Battle from 2013 to 2015, which delivered the hits "Vacation" from The Smurfs 2, "Wild Wild Love" with Pitbull, "Ugly Heart", and "Lighthouse" dedicated to group-mate Simone Battle, who died by suicide in September 2014.

2016–2019: Solo career 
On July 13, 2016, Estrada released "#FreeTitties", her first solo record since departing G.R.L. On September 28, 2016, Estrada released her follow up single "Hungover", which was accompanied by a music video released on October 4.

Eight months after the release of "Hungover", Estrada released "Phone Off" on May 5, 2017. "Bigger Than You", her next single, shortly followed and released on June 2, 2017. Estrada performed at Galore's first ever Girl Cult Festival on August 20, 2017, in Los Angeles.

2020–present: G.R.L. reunion 
In 2020, she began to post short dance clips with former bandmates Lauren Bennett, Natasha Slayton, and Paula Van Oppen on Instagram and TikTok. In 2021, Estrada announced that she, Slayton, and Bennett would be reuniting as G.R.L. to release new music starting in 2021.

Discography

Extended plays

Singles

As lead artist

Other releases

As featured artist

Filmography

Film

Television

Awards and nominations

Results

References

External links 
 Website

1992 births
Canadian dance musicians
Canadian musicians of Filipino descent
Canadian contemporary R&B singers
Living people
Musicians from British Columbia
People from Surrey, British Columbia
Canadian women pop singers
21st-century Canadian women singers
G.R.L. members